Koswatta is a junction located inside the main town Battaramulla located near Colombo in Sri Lanka. The junction is also known as the "Thalangama-Koswatte" junction.

A government hospital and a police station are located in this area.

Suburbs of Colombo

Populated places in Western Province, Sri Lanka